Abbé Pierre, OFM Cap,  (born Henri Marie Joseph Grouès; 5 August 191222 January 2007) was a French Catholic priest, member of the Resistance during World War II, and deputy of the Popular Republican Movement (MRP). 

In 1949, he founded the Emmaus movement, with the goal of helping poor and homeless people and refugees. He was one of the most popular figures in France but had his name removed from such polls after some time.

Youth and education 
Grouès was born on 5 August 1912 in Lyon, France to a wealthy Catholic family of silk traders, the fifth of eight children. His aunt was the writer Héra Mirtel. He spent his childhood in Irigny, near Lyon. He was twelve when he met François Chabbey and went for the first time with his father to an Order circle, the brotherhood of the "Hospitaliers veilleurs" in which the mainly middle-class members would serve the poor by providing barber services.

Grouès became a member of the Scouts de France in which he was nicknamed "Meditative Beaver" (Castor méditatif). In 1928, aged 16, he made the decision to join a monastic order, but he had to wait until he was seventeen and a half to fulfill this ambition. In 1931 Grouès entered the Capuchin Order, the principal offshoot of the Franciscans, renouncing his inheritances and offering all his possessions to charities. 

Known as frère Philippe (Brother Philippe), he entered the monastery of Crest in 1932, where he lived for seven years. He had to leave in 1939 after developing severe lung infections, which made the strict and hard monastic life difficult to cope with. He became chaplain to the hospital of La Mure (Isère), and then of an orphanage in the Côte-Saint-André (also in the Isère department). After being ordained a Roman Catholic priest on 24 August 1938, he became curate of Grenoble's cathedral in April 1939, only a few months before the invasion of Poland.

The Jesuit Fr. Henri de Lubac told him on the day of his priestly ordination: "ask the Holy Spirit to grant you the same anti-clericalism of the saints."

World War II
When World War II broke out in 1939, he was mobilised as a non-commissioned officer in the train transport corps. According to his official biography, he helped Jewish people to escape Nazi persecution following the July 1942 mass arrests in Paris, called the Rafle du Vel' d'Hiv, and another raid in the area of Grenoble in the non-occupied zone: "In July 1942, two fleeing Jews asked him for help. Having discovered the persecution taking place, he immediately went to learn how to make false passports. Starting in August 1942, he guided Jewish people to Switzerland".

His pseudonym dates from his work with the French Resistance during the Second World War, when he operated under several different names. Based in Grenoble, an important center of the Resistance, he helped Jews and politically persecuted escape to Switzerland. In 1942, he assisted Jacques de Gaulle (the brother of Charles de Gaulle) and his wife escape to Switzerland.

He participated in establishing a section of the maquis where he officially became one of the local leaders in the Vercors Plateau and in the Chartreuse Mountains. He helped people to avoid being taken into the Service du travail obligatoire (STO), the Nazi forced-labour program agreed upon with Pierre Laval, by creating in Grenoble the first refugee for resistants to the STO; he founded the clandestine newspaper L'Union patriotique indépendante. For a time, in 1943, he was given shelter by Lucie Coutaz, a Resistance member who later became his secretary and was his assistant in his charity work until her death in 1982.

He was arrested twice, once in 1944 by the Nazi police in the city of Cambo-les-Bains in the Pyrénées-Atlantiques, but was quickly released and travelled to Spain then Gibraltar before joining the Free French Forces of General de Gaulle in Algeria. In the Free North Africa, he became a chaplain in the French Navy on the battleship Jean Bart in Casablanca. He had become an important character and symbol of the French Resistance.

At the end of the war, he was awarded the Croix de guerre 1939-1945 with bronze palms and the Médaille de la Résistance. Like other members of the Resistance, his experience would mark him for life, teaching him the necessity of engaging himself to protect fundamental human rights through legal means and, if need be, through a sort of civil disobedience doctrine.

Political career (1945–51) and the 1960s/70s
When the war was over, following de Gaulle's entourage's advice and the approbation of the archbishop of Paris, Abbé Pierre was elected deputy for Meurthe-et-Moselle department in both National Constituent Assemblies in 1945–1946 as an independent close to the Popular Republican Movement (MRP), mainly consisting of Christian democratic members of the Resistance. In 1946, he was re-elected as a member of the National Assembly, but this time as a member of the MRP. Abbé Pierre became vice-president of the World Federalist Movement in 1947, a universal federalist movement.

After a bloody accident resulting in the death of a blue-collar worker, Édouard Mazé, in Brest in 1950, Abbé Pierre decided to put an end to his MRP affiliation on 28 April 1950, writing a letter titled "Pourquoi je quitte le MRP" ("Why I quit the MRP"), where he denounced the political and social attitude of the MRP party. He then joined the Christian socialist movement named Ligue de la jeune République, created in 1912 by Marc Sangnier, but decided to finally end his political career. In 1951, before the end of his mandate, he returned to his first vocation: to help homeless people. With the small indemnities he received as a deputy, he invested in a run-down house near Paris in the wealthy Neuilly-Plaisance neighbourhood. Astounding his neighbours, the priest began to repair the roof and the whole house, and finally made of it the first Emmaüs base (because, according to him, it was simply too big for one person).

Although the Abbé then put a definitive end to his involvement in representative politics, preferring to invest his energies in the Emmaus charity movement, he never completely abandoned the political field, taking strong stances on many and various subjects.

Thus, when the decolonization movement was slowly beginning to emerge in the whole world, he attempted in 1956 to convince Tunisian leader Habib Bourguiba to obtain independence without using violence. Present in various international conferences at the end of the 1950s, he met Colombian priest Camilo Torres (1929–1966), a predecessor of Liberation theology, who asked for his advice on the Colombian Church's criticism of "workers' priests." He was also received by US president Eisenhower and Mohammed V of Morocco in 1955 and 1956.
In 1962 he resided for several months in Charles de Foucauld's retreat in Béni-Abbés (Algeria). 

The Abbé was then called to India in 1971 by Jayaprakash Narayan to represent, along with the Ligue des droits de l'homme (Human Rights League) France in the issues of refugees. Indira Gandhi then invited him to deal with the question of Bengali refugees, and the Abbé founded Emmaus communities in Bangladesh.

Emmaus

1949: the origin 
Emmaus (Emmaüs in French) was started in 1949. Its name is a reference to a village in Israel appearing in the Gospel of Luke, where two disciples extended hospitality to Jesus just after his resurrection without recognizing him. In that way, Emmaus's mission is to help poor and homeless people. It is a secular organization. In 1950 the first community of Emmaus companions was created in Neuilly-Plaisance close to Paris in France. The Emmaus community raises funds for the construction of housing by selling used goods. "Emmaus, it's a little like the wheelbarrow, the shovels and the pickaxes coming before the banners. A sort of social fuel derived from salvaging defeating men."

There were initial difficulties raising funds, so in 1952, Abbé Pierre decided to be a contestant on the Radio Luxembourg game show Quitte ou double (Double or Nothing) for the prize money; he ended up winning 256,000 francs.

Winter 1954: "Uprising of kindness"
Abbé Pierre became famous during the extremely cold winter of 1954 in France, when homeless people were dying in the streets. Following the failure of the projected law on lodgings, he gave a well-remembered speech on Radio Luxembourg on 1 February 1954, and asked Le Figaro, a conservative newspaper which, as he said, was read by "the powerful", to publish his call:

The next morning, the press wrote of an "uprising of kindness" (insurrection de la bonté) and the now-famous call for help ended up raising 500 million francs in donations (Charlie Chaplin gave 2 million). This enormous amount was totally unexpected; telephone operators and the postal service were overwhelmed, and owing to the volume of donations, several weeks were needed just to sort them, distribute them, and find a place to stock them throughout the country. Moreover, this call attracted volunteers from all over the country to help them, including wealthy bourgeoises who were emotionally shaken by the Abbé's call: first to do the redistribution, but then to duplicate the effort all around France. Quite quickly, Abbé Pierre had to organise his movement by creating the Emmaus communities on 23 March 1954. 

In an Emmaus community, volunteers help homeless people by giving them accommodation, and somewhere to eat and work. A number of Emmaus volunteers are also formerly homeless people themselves, from all age groups, religious or ethnic origins, and social backgrounds. The Abbé Pierre strived to show desperate people that they too could help others, and thus that the weak could still help even weaker people.

A book was written by Boris Simon which described the misery of poor ragpicker communities, called "Abbé Pierre and the ragpickers of Emmaus" which helped spread knowledge about the Emmaus community.
In 1955 Abbé Pierre gives president Eisenhower an English translation of the book, in the oval office. 

The Emmaus communities quickly spread worldwide. The Abbé traveled to Beyrouth (Beirut, Lebanon) in 1959, to assist in the creation of the first multiconfessional Emmaus group there; it was founded by a Sunni (Muslim), a Melkite (Catholic) archbishop and a Maronite (Christian) writer.

1980s to 2000s

After the 1981 election of President François Mitterrand (Socialist Party, PS) (during which he called for blank vote), the Abbé Pierre supported the initiative of the French Premier Laurent Fabius (PS) to create in 1984 the Revenu minimum d'insertion (RMI), a welfare system for indigents.

The same year, he organized the operation "Charity Christmas", which, relayed by France Soir, brought 6 million Francs and 200 tons of products. The actor Coluche, who had organized the charitable Restos du Cœur, offered him 150 million French cents received by his organisation. Coluche's huge success with the Restos du Cœur, caused by his popularity (Coluche had even tried to present himself to the 1981 presidential election before withdrawing), convinced the Abbé again of the necessity and value of such charitable struggles and the usefulness of the media in such endeavours. 

In 1983, he spoke with Italian President Sandro Pertini to plead the cause of Vanni Mulinaris, imprisoned on charge of assistance to the Red Brigades (BR), and even observed eight days of hunger strike from 26 May to 3 June 1984 in the Cathedral of Turin to protest against detention conditions of "Brigadists" in Italian prisons and the imprisonment without trial of Vanni Mulinaris, who was recognized innocent sometimes afterwards. Italian magistrate Carlo Mastelloni recalled in the Corriere della Sera in 2007 that a niece of the Abbé was a secretary at Hyperion language school in Paris, directed by Vanni Mulinaris, and married to one of the Italians refugees then wanted by the Italian justice. According to the Corriere della Sera, it would even have been him who convinced then president François Mitterrand to grant protection from extradition to left-wing Italian activists who took refuge in France and had broken with their past.

More than 20 years later, the ANSA, Italian press agency, recalled that he had supported in 2005 one of his physicians, Michele d'Auria, who was a former member of Prima Linea, an Italian far-left group, and was accused of having participated in hold-ups during 1990. Like many other Italian activists, he had exiled himself to France during the "years of lead", and then joined the Emmaus companions. La Repubblica specified that Italian justice has recognized the innocence of all people close to the Hyperion School

Following the Abbé's death in January 2007, Italian magistrate Carlo Mastelloni declared to the Corriere della Sera that during the abduction of Aldo Moro Abbé Pierre had gone to the Christian Democrats' headquarters in Rome  in an attempt to speak with its secretary Benigno Zaccagnini, in favor of a "hard line" of refusal of negotiations along with the BR.

In 1988 Abbé Pierre met representatives of the International Monetary Fund (IMF) to discuss the difficult financial, monetary and human issues brought by the huge Third World debt (starting in 1982, Mexico had announced it could not pay the service of its debt, triggering the 1980s Latin American debt crisis). In the 1990s, the Abbé criticized the apartheid regime in South Africa. In 1995, after a three-year-long siege of Sarajevo, he went there to exhort nations of the world to put an end to the violence, and requested French military operation against the Serb positions in Bosnia. 

During the Gulf War (1990–91), the Abbé directly addressed himself to US President George H. W. Bush and Iraq President Saddam Hussein. He asked French president François Mitterrand to engage himself in matters concerning refugees, in particular by the creation of a stronger organisation than the current UN High Commissioner for Refugees (HCR). He encountered this year the Dalai Lama during inter-religious peace encounters. A staunch supporter of the Palestinian cause, he has attracted attention with some of his statements on the Israeli-Palestine conflict

His support "à titre amical" ("in title of friendship") for Roger Garaudy in 1996 brought controversy. The "Garaudy Affair" had been revealed in January 1996 by the Canard enchaîné satirical newspaper, which prompted a series of denunciations against his book, "The Foundational Myths of Israeli Politics," and led Garaudy to be charged of negationism (before being convicted in 1998, under the 1990 Gayssot Act). But Garaudy provoked public indignation when he announced in March that he was supported by the Abbé Pierre, who was immediately excluded from the honour committee of the LICRA (International League against Racism and Anti-Semitism). The Abbé condemned those who tried to "negate, banalize or falsify the Shoah," but his continued support to Garaudy as a friend was criticized by all anti-racist, Jewish organisations (MRAP, CRIF, Anti-Defamation League, etc.) and the Church hierarchy. His friend Bernard Kouchner, co-founder of Médecins Sans Frontières (MSF), criticized him for "absolving the intolerable," while Cardinal Jean-Marie Lustiger (and archbishop of Paris from 1981 to 2005) publicly disavowed him. The Abbé then went into retreat in the Benedictine monastery of Praglia near Padua, Italy. In the film documentary Un abbé nommé Pierre, une vie au service des autres, the Abbé declared that his support had been towards the person of Roger Garaudy, and not towards his statements in his book, which he had not read.

The curator of the Deportation and Resistance Museum of the Isère department where Grouès carried on most of his Resistant activities declared that the Abbé would have merited ten times to be named Righteous Among the Nations for his struggle in favor of Jews during Vichy.

Following this 1996 controversial support to a personal acquaintance, the Abbé was shunned for a small period by the media, although the Abbé remained a popular figure. In 2004, he went to Algeria after the rebuilding of lodgings by the Fondation Abbé Pierre, following the 2003 earthquake which destroyed parts of the country.

Positions on the Church hierarchy and the Vatican's policies
The Abbé's positions towards the Church and the Vatican also brought controversy. His positions on social issues and engagements were at times explicitly socialist and opposed to the Church.  He maintained a relationship with the progressive French Catholic Bishop Jacques Gaillot, to which he recalled his duty of "instinct of a measured insolence", He didn't like Mother Teresa. Despite her work for the poor, her strict adherence to Catholic teaching on morality did not sit well with Abbé Pierre's left wing ideology. He had difficult relations with the Vatican. L'Osservatore Romano, not known for reporting the deaths of priests, did not report on his death right away in 2007. Even though it is not customary for the Pope to offer condolences on the death of individual priests, Abbé Pierre's supporters were heavily critical of Pope Benedict XVI for not making an exception. Father Lombardi, spokesman of the Vatican, pointed journalists to the statement made by the French Church, while Benedict XVI did mention his death in private audiences. Official reactions from the Church came in two interviews of French cardinals, Roger Etchegaray and Paul Poupard. His criticisms of what he considered the lavish lifestyle of the Vatican got him a lot of publicity (especially when he reproached John Paul II for his expensive travels), but were not well received by the public. Cardinal Secretary of State Tarcisio Bertone lauded his "action in favor of poor": "Informed of the death of Abbe Pierre, the Holy Father gives thanks for his activity in favor of the poorest, by which he bore witness to the charity that comes from Christ. Entrusting to divine mercy this priest whose whole life was dedicated to fighting poverty, he asks the Lord to welcome him into the peace of His kingdom. By way of comfort and hope, His Holiness sends you a heartfelt apostolic blessing, which he extends to the family of the departed, to members of the communities of Emmaus, and to everyone gathering for the funeral."

His support for the ordination of women and for married clergy put him at odds with Christian tradition, Church leaders and a substantial portion of French Catholics that followed the traditional teaching of the Church. The same stances, according to British state media, made him popular among the declining number of left-wing Catholics in France. In his book Mon Dieu... pourquoi? (God... Why?, 2005), co-written with Frédéric Lenoir, he admitted to breaking his solemn promise of celibacy by having had casual sex with women. Despite very strong grassroots opposition to adoption by same-sex couples, Abbé Pierre dismissed people's concerns that it deprives children of a mother or father and turns them into objects. The Abbé also opposed the traditional Catholic policy on contraceptives.

International recognition
Abbé Pierre had the distinction of having been voted France's most popular person for many years, though in 2003 he was surpassed by Zinedine Zidane, moving into second place. In 2005 Abbé Pierre came third in a television poll to choose Le Plus Grand Français (The Greatest Frenchman).

In 1998, he has been made Grand Officer of the National Order of Quebec while in 2004, he was awarded the Grand Cross of the Legion of Honor by Jacques Chirac. He also received the Balzan Prize for Humanity, Peace and Brotherhood among Peoples in 1991 "For having fought, throughout his life, for the defence of human rights, democracy and peace. For having entirely dedicated himself to helping to relieve spiritual and physical suffering. For having inspired – regardless of nationality, race or religion – universal solidarity with the Emmaus Communities."

Accidents and health problems
He was regularly sick, particularly in the lungs when he was young. He was left unscathed in several dangerous situations:
 In 1950, while on a flight in India, he survived when his plane had to make an emergency landing due to engine failure.
 In 1963, his boat shipwrecked in the Río de la Plata, between Argentina and Uruguay. He survived by clinging to a wooden part of the boat, while around him 80 passengers died. Later on, while on a trip to Algiers, he showed the pocket knife, which had enabled him to survive this ordeal. He was full of gratitude also for the children lodged at an orphanage, and asked the cardinal archbishop of Algiers, Léon-Etienne Duval, to help out the orphanage (or Kasbah).

All of these experiences together created the image of Abbé Pierre being a miraculé.

Death 
Abbé Pierre remained active until his death on 22 January 2007 in the Val-de-Grâce military hospital in Paris, following a lung infection, aged 94.
He took a stance on most social struggles: supporting illegal aliens, assisting the homeless (the "Enfants de Don Quichotte" movement (end of 2006-start of 2007)) and social movements in favor of requisitioning empty buildings and offices (squats), etc. He continued to read each day La Croix, the Christian social daily newspaper. In January 2007, he went to the National Assembly to oppose those deputies wanting to change the law on lodging for homeless people, promoted by President Jacques Chirac after the mobilization of the Enfants de Don Quichotte NGO. Following his death, the Minister of Social Cohesion Jean-Louis Borloo (UMP) decided to give Abbé Pierre's name to the law, despite the latter's scepticism of the real value and use of the law. In 2005 he had opposed conservative deputies who wanted to reform the Gayssot Act on housing projects (loi SRU), which sought to impose a 20% housing project limit in each town, on penalty of fines.

After homage by dignitaries, several hundred ordinary Parisians (among them professor Albert Jacquard, who struggled with the Abbé for the cause of homelessness) went to the Val-de-Grâce chapel to see Abbé Pierre's corpse. His funeral on 26 January 2007 at the Cathedral of Notre Dame de Paris was attended by numerous distinguished people: President Jacques Chirac, former President Valéry Giscard d'Estaing, Prime Minister Dominique de Villepin, many French Ministers, and of course the Companions of Emmaus, who were placed at the front of the congregation in the cathedral, according to Abbé Pierre's last wishes. He was buried in a cemetery in Esteville, a small village in Seine-Maritime where he used to live. Cardinal Philippe Barbarin, archbishop of Lyon, evoked a possible beatification, but it seems unlikely in the near future.

Honours
:
 Grand Cross of the Order of the Legion of Honor (2004)
 Grand Officer of the Order of the Legion of Honor (1992)
 Commander of the Order of the Legion of Honor (1987)
 Officer of the Order of the Legion of Honor (1981)
 Recipient of the Médaille militaire
  Recipient of the Croix de guerre 1939–1945 with bronze palms
  Recipient of the Médaille de la Résistance
:
 Grand Officer of the National Order of Quebec

Awards
 Balzan Prize

Bibliography 
He has written many books and articles, including a book for children aged over ten, titled C'est quoi la mort?. Many of his publications are translated into English. All authors' rights (books, discs and videos) are versed to the Fondation Abbé Pierre concerning lodging and accommodations for those lacking these fundamental rights.

 1987: Bernard Chevallier interroge l'abbé Pierre: Emmaüs ou venger l'homme, with Bernard Chevalier, éd. LGF/Livre de Poche, Paris. — .
 1988: Cent poèmes contre la misère, éd. Le Cherche-midi, Paris — .
 1993: Dieu et les hommes, with Bernard Kouchner, éd. Robert Laffont — .
 1994: Testament... — . Réédition 2005, éd. Bayard/Centurion, Paris — .
 1994: Une terre et des hommes, éd. Cerf, Paris.
 1994: Absolu, éd. Seuil, Paris.
 1996: Dieu merci, éd. Fayard/Centurion, Paris.
 1996: Le bal des exclus, éd. Fayard, Paris.
 1997: Mémoires d'un croyant, éd. Fayard, Paris.
 1999: Fraternité, éd. Fayard, Paris.
 1999: Paroles, éd. Actes Sud, Paris.
 1999: C'est quoi la mort?,
 1999: J'attendrai le plaisir du Bon Dieu: l'intégrale des entretiens d'Edmond Blattchen, éd. Alice, Paris.
 2000: En route vers l'absolu, éd. Flammarion, Paris.
 2001: La Planète des pauvres. Le tour du monde à vélo des communautés Emmaüs, de Louis Harenger, Louis Harenger, Michel Friedman, Emmaüs international, Abbé Pierre, éd. J'ai lu, Paris — .
 2002: Confessions, éd. Albin Michel, Paris — .
 2002: Je voulais être marin, missionnaire ou brigand, rédigé avec Denis Lefèvre, éd. Le Cherche-midi, Paris — . Réédition en livre de poche, éd. J'ai lu, Paris — .
 2004: L'Abbé Pierre, la construction d'une légende, by Philippe Falcone, éd. Golias — .
 2004: L'Abbé Pierre parle aux jeunes, with Pierre-Roland Saint-Dizier, éd. Du Signe, Paris — .
 2005: Le sourire d'un ange, éd. Elytis, Paris.
 2005: Mon Dieu... pourquoi? Petites méditations sur la foi chrétienne et le sens de la vie, with Frédéric Lenoir, éd. Plon — .
 2006: Servir : Paroles de vie, with Albine Navarino, éd. Presses du Châtelet, Paris — .

Discography (interviews, etc.) 
 2001: Radioscopie: Abbé Pierre - Entretien avec Jacques Chancel, CD Audio - .
 1988-2003: Éclats De Voix, suite de CD Audio, Poèmes et réflexions, en 4 volumes:
 Vol. 1: Le Temps des Catacombes, rééd. label Celia - .
 Vol. 2: Hors de Soi, rééd. label Celia - .
 Vol. 3: Corsaire de Dieu, rééd. label Celia - .
 Vol. 4: ?, label Scalen - .
 2005: Le CD Testament..., pour fêter le 56e anniversaire de la Foundation d'Emmaüs (réflexions personnelles, textes et paroles inspirées de la Bible) - .
 2005: Avant de partir..., le testament audio de l'Abbé Pierre, CD audio et vidéos pour PC, prières et musiques de méditation - .
 2006: L'Insurgé de l'amour, label Revues Bayard, Paris - .
 2006: Paroles de Paix de l'Abbé Pierre, CD audio, label Fremeux - .

Filmography 
 1955: Les Chiffonniers d'Emmaüs from Robert Darène with Pierre Mondy.
 1989: Hiver 54, l'abbé Pierre from Denis Amar, with Lambert Wilson and Claudia Cardinale.

See also
 Emmaus Mouvement
 Streetwise priest
 List of peace activists

Notes

References

External links 

 Emmaus International, Abbé Pierre's sole legatee
 Fondation Abbé Pierre
 International Balzan Foundation
 Obituary in Le Monde (Paris), 23 January 2007 (English translation)
 7 January 1954 call for homeless people, published in Le Figaro (22 January 2007)
 French review of press titles for his death
 An "Insight" episode which mentions Abbe Pierre, who was portrayed by Ricardo Montalbán

1912 births
2007 deaths
Clergy from Lyon
20th-century French Roman Catholic priests
Abbés
Capuchins
Politicians from Lyon
Popular Republican Movement politicians
Young Republic League politicians
Members of the Constituent Assembly of France (1945)
Members of the Constituent Assembly of France (1946)
Deputies of the 1st National Assembly of the French Fourth Republic
French anti-poverty advocates
French humanitarians
French Army soldiers
French Navy chaplains
World War II chaplains
French Army personnel of World War II
French Resistance members
Recipients of the Croix de Guerre 1939–1945 (France)
Grand Croix of the Légion d'honneur
Grand Officers of the National Order of Quebec
Recipients of the Resistance Medal
Officers of the National Order of the Cedar